Grant County is a county located in the U.S. state of Washington. As of the 2020 census, the population was 99,123. The county seat is Ephrata, and the largest city is Moses Lake. The county was formed out of Douglas County in February 1909 and is named for U.S. President Ulysses S. Grant.

Grant County comprises the Moses Lake, WA Micropolitan Statistical Area, which is also part of the Moses Lake-Othello, WA Combined Statistical Area.

History
Native American cultures in the area included the Interior Salish, Wenatchi, and Okanagan.  The first white settlers began to arrive in the mid-to-late-19th century, primarily with the goal of raising livestock. One government official described the area in 1879 as, "…a desolation where even the most hopeful can find nothing in its future prospects to cheer."

When railroads arrived they also brought new settlers, and the economy began a shift from ranching to dryland farming. This transition required the people to have ready access to water, and irrigation became a necessity. The first large-scale irrigation attempts began in 1898, but it would be years before real success.

With the influx of dryland farming, the county soon boasted access to three major railway systems; the Great Northern Railway, Northern Pacific Railroad and the Chicago, Milwaukee & St. Paul Railroad. In addition, the Columbia River in this area was navigable. This allowed crops to be transported out of the area easily. Towns like Wilson Creek, Quincy and Ephrata began to thrive.

The Washington State Legislature officially created Grant County on February 24, 1909, naming it in the memory of Ulysses S. Grant, the 18th president of the United States, and a major contributor to the Union victory in the American Civil War. The county seat was located in Ephrata. The area's population at the time stood at around 8700 people.

The Columbia Basin Project, which ultimately produced the Grand Coulee Dam with its associated irrigation and hydroelectric generating grid, was an outgrowth of the 1902 creation of the United States Bureau of Reclamation. When that agency began studying feasibility of projects in the Northwestern United States, competing groups from Spokane, Wenatchee, Ephrata and elsewhere advanced competing possibilities. One idea was to dam the Columbia River at Grand Coulee. This concept was approved in 1933, and construction continued in the following decades. The project would fundamentally change the region forever.

Geography
It is the fourth-largest county in Washington by area.

The environmental climate of Grant County is characterized by hot summers and cold winters. Rainshadow caused by the Cascade mountains separates eastern Washington, including Grant County, from western Washington's more temperate and oceanic climate.

A sign alongside Interstate Highway I-90 where it enters Grant County welcomes travelers to Grant County and says the county is "The nation's leading potato producing county".

Geographic features
Columbia River
Grand Coulee
Moses Lake
Potholes Reservoir
Soap Lake
Ulysses S. Peak, unofficial name of county high point

Major highways

 U.S. Route 2
 State Route 17
 State Route 28

Adjacent counties

Douglas County - north
Okanogan County - northeast
Adams County - east
Lincoln County - east
Franklin County - southeast
Benton County - south
Yakima County - southwest
Kittitas County - west

National protected areas
 Columbia National Wildlife Refuge (part)
 Hanford Reach National Monument (part)
 Lake Roosevelt National Recreation Area (part)
 Saddle Mountain National Wildlife Refuge (part)

Demographics

2000 census
As of the 2000 census, there were 74,698 people, 25,204 households and 18,676 families living in the county. The population density was 28 per square mile (11/km2). There were 29,081 housing units at an average density of 11 per square mile (4/km2). The racial makeup of the county was 76.54% White, 0.99% Black or African American, 1.16% Native American, 0.87% Asian, 0.07% Pacific Islander, 17.36% from other races, and 3.01% from two or more races. 30.09% of the population were Hispanic or Latino of any race. 15.1% were of German, 8.1% United States or American, 8.0% English and 5.4% Irish ancestry. 72.0% spoke English and 25.3% Spanish as their first language.

There were 25,204 households, of which 39.90% had children under the age of 18 living with them, 59.30% were married couples living together, 9.80% had a female householder with no husband present, and 25.90% were non-families. 21.20% of all households were made up of individuals, and 8.90% had someone living alone who was 65 years of age or older. The average household size was 2.92 and the average family size was 3.38.

32.00% of the population were under the age of 18, 9.80% from 18 to 24, 27.00% from 25 to 44, 19.70% from 45 to 64, and 11.50% who were 65 years of age or older. The median age was 31 years. For every 100 females there were 104.50 males. For every 100 females age 18 and over, there were 103.40 males.

The median household income $35,276, and the median family income was $38,938. Males had a median income of $32,414 versus $24,310 for females. The per capita income for the county was $15,037. About 13.10% of families and 17.40% of the population were below the poverty line, including 22.30% of those under age 18 and 9.40% of those age 65 or over.

2010 census
As of the 2010 census, there were 89,120 people, 30,041 households, and 21,800 families living in the county. The racial makeup of the county was 72.8% white, 1.2% American Indian, 1.1% black or African American, 0.9% Asian, 0.1% Pacific islander, 20.4% from other races, and 3.5% from two or more races. Those of Hispanic or Latino origin made up 38.3% of the population. In terms of ancestry, 15.5% were German, 8.9% were English, 7.1% were Irish, and 3.9% were American.

Of the 30,041 households, 40.6% had children under the age of 18 living with them, 54.7% were married couples living together, 11.5% had a female householder with no husband present, 27.4% were non-families, and 22.0% of all households were made up of individuals. The average household size was 2.93 and the average family size was 3.40. The median age was 32.1 years.

The median income for a household in the county was $42,572 and the median income for a family was $50,065. Males had a median income of $39,530 versus $27,417 for females. The per capita income for the county was $19,718. About 15.7% of families and 20.4% of the population were below the poverty line, including 28.4% of those under age 18 and 7.2% of those age 65 or over.

Communities

Cities

Electric City
Ephrata (county seat)
George
Grand Coulee
Mattawa
Moses Lake
Quincy
Royal City
Soap Lake
Warden

Towns

Coulee City
Coulee Dam (partial)
Hartline
Krupp (formally known as Marlin)
Wilson Creek

Census-designated places

Banks Lake South
Beverly
Cascade Valley
Crescent Bar
Desert Aire
Lakeview
Marine View
Moses Lake North
Schwana
Sunland Estates
Wheeler

Other unincorporated communities

Adco
Adrian
Burke
Lakeview Park
Mae
Ruff
Smyrna
Stratford
Trinidad
Winchester

Education
School districts include:

 Almira School District
 Coulee-Hartline School District
 Ephrata School District
 Grand Coulee Dam School District
 Moses Lake School District
 Odessa School District
 Othello School District
 Quincy School District
 Royal School District
 Soap Lake School District
 Wahluke School District
 Warden School District
 Wilson Creek School District

Politics
Grant County is a reliably Republican county in presidential elections; it has not voted for the Democratic candidate since Lyndon B. Johnson's landslide victory in 1964. It has cast at least 60% of its vote for the Republican presidential candidate in all six elections since 2000.

Economy 
Grant is the #1 crop-producing County in the State, producing a large part of the Washington hay harvest.

See also
Grant County Public Utility District
National Register of Historic Places listings in Grant County, Washington

References

External links
Grant County
Photos of Grant County
Grant Transit Authority

 
1909 establishments in Washington (state)
Populated places established in 1909
Eastern Washington